Věra Suchánková-Hamplová (29 October 1932 – 12 February 2004) was a Czech pair skater who competed internationally for Czechoslovakia. With her skating partner, Zdeněk Doležal, she was the 1958 World silver medalist and a two-time European champion (1957, 1958). They represented Czechoslovakia at the 1956 Winter Olympics and placed 8th.

Suchánková was born on 29 October 1932 in Pardubice. Her sports club was Rapid Pardubice. She also played tennis, winning a national junior-level tournament in 1951. After retiring from competition, she worked as a skating coach in Karlovy Vary. She died on 12 February 2004 in Pila, Karlovy Vary District. In 2016, Pardubice named Suchánková as one of the athletes to be included in the city's planned sports hall of fame.

Results
(with Zdeněk Doležal)

References

1932 births
2004 deaths
Czech female pair skaters
Czechoslovak female pair skaters
Olympic figure skaters of Czechoslovakia
Figure skaters at the 1956 Winter Olympics
Sportspeople from Pardubice
World Figure Skating Championships medalists
European Figure Skating Championships medalists